The Henry River is a river in the Pilbara region of Western Australia.

The headwaters of the river rise between High Range and Barlee Range. It flows in a northerly direction close to the western edge of the Barlee Range Nature Reserve, through Minnie Springs and discharges into the Ashburton River south-east of Nanutarra.

There are five tributaries of the river including; Discovery Creek, Telfer River and Wannery Creek.

The river was named in 1866 by the pastoralist and explorer, E. T. Hooley when he found the river while creating a stock route from Perth to Roebourne. Hooley named the river after John Henry Monger, a merchant, from York.

References

Rivers of the Pilbara region